Stephen John Hoadley (born 7 July 1955) is a former English cricketer.  Hoadley was a right-handed batsman who bowled right-arm off break.  He was born at Pembury, Kent.

Hoadley made his first-class debut for Sussex against Warwickshire in the 1975 County Championship.  He made six further first-class appearances for the county, the last of which came against Kent in the 1976 County Championship.  In his seven first-class matches, he scored a total of 202 runs at an average of 18.36, with a high score of 58.  This score was one of two fifties he made and came against Hampshire in 1975.  Hoadley also made three List A appearances for Sussex in the 1975 John Player League against Warwickshire, Nottinghamshire and Kent.  He scored just 13 runs at an average of 6.50, with a high score of 8 in these three matches.

His brother, Simon, also played first-class and List A cricket for Sussex.

References

External links
Stephen Hoadley at ESPNcricinfo
Stephen Hoadley at CricketArchive

1955 births
Living people
People from Pembury
English cricketers
Sussex cricketers